My Mother is the Most Beautiful Woman in the World is a 1945 picture book by Becky Reyher and illustrated by Ruth Stiles Gannett. A lost girl looks for her mother who is, in the girl's eyes, the most beautiful woman in the world. The book was a recipient of a 1946 Caldecott Honor for its illustrations.

References

1945 children's books
American picture books
Caldecott Honor-winning works